Siga was a port city of the ancient kingdom of Numidia.

Siga may also refer to:

 Shiga Prefecture, Japan
 Tapen Siga, a BJP politician in Arunachal Pradesh, India
 Siga Tandia, a French footballer
 Siga (moth), a genus of moths
 SIGA Technologies, a pharmaceutical company
 Peste & Sida and Despe e Siga, Portuguese musical groups